Sauland is a village (parish) and the administrative center in Hjartdal municipality in Telemark county. The population is above 800 people in 2016, which equates over half of all households in the whole municipality. The village is placed in the south/east corner of the municipality and is one of the three parishes in Hjartdal. The place was until Notodden was founded, a center in Aust-Telemark, and had at this time the magistrate for the district. Until 1860 it had its own separate stave church, which was torn down and replaced with the wooden church that stands today.

The village bordering to the parishes Tuddal, Gransherad, Heddal, Seljordsbygda and Hjartdalsbygda. It also bordered earlier to Bøbygda before the current municipal boundary was set.

The village has grocery store, gas station, crafts, auction and second-hand shop, bakery, doctor, day care, retirement, banking, guesthouses, municipal offices, social security offices, car and truck repair shop, wood and farm shop and a shooting range.

Here is also Telemark's second largest mo located, called Ålamoen, where gravel periodically is removed. Ålamoens exploitable volume is 20,776 m³, and alternator contains 83 million m³ with masses. It is also among the largest in the country, which contributes to make Hjartdal the second largest gravel municipality in the county. In the coming years it is planned to establish a hydroelectric power station that will cover and utilize large parts of the village, where the power plant will be located in the mountain north of Skårnes.

Sauland is also known for the discovery of mineral thulite, which is a manganese rich red-pink variant of the mineral zoisite. It was first found type located between the farms Kleppen and Øvstebø, north of Sauland centrum, where it was discovered for nearly 200 years ago by the Swede Anders Ekeberg.

Name 
The Old Norwegian place name was Sviðurlandir or Sviðurland. The name probably means "land that is cleared by burning". Svid- meaning scorch and -land meaning land(scape). Between the 17th and 20th century, the parish name had a variety such as Sourland, Souland and Saudland in written Danish in Norwegian sources.

Notable people 
  (1849-1920), politician and entrepreneur
  (b. 1937), professor
 Anne Hytta (b. 1974), folk musician
  (b. 1975), author
 Sigrid Louise Gundersen (b. 1982), television host
  (b. 1990), singer

External links 
 Sauland Bygdelag
 Hjartdal Historielag

References

Villages in Vestfold og Telemark
Hjartdal